The 2004–05 Connecticut Huskies men's basketball team represented the University of Connecticut in the 2004–05 collegiate men's basketball season. The Huskies completed the season with a 23–8 overall record. The Huskies were members of the Big East Conference where they finished with a 13–3 record and were the regular season co-champions. They made it to the Second Round in the 2005 NCAA Division I men's basketball tournament. The Huskies played their home games at Harry A. Gampel Pavilion in Storrs, Connecticut and the Hartford Civic Center in Hartford, Connecticut, and they were led by nineteenth-year head coach Jim Calhoun.

Roster
Listed are the student athletes who were members of the 2004–2005 team.

Schedule

|-
!colspan=12 style=|Exhibition Games

|-
!colspan=12 style=|Non-conference regular season

|-
!colspan=12 style=|Big East regular season

|-
!colspan=9 style="|Big East tournament

|-
!colspan=9 style=|NCAA tournament

Schedule Source:

References

UConn Huskies men's basketball seasons
Connecticut
Connecticut Huskies men's basketball team
Connecticut Huskies men's basketball team
Connecticut